Abernathy Airport may refer to:

 Abernathy Field in Pulaski, Tennessee, United States (FAA: GZS)
 Abernathy Municipal Airport in Abernathy, Texas, United States (FAA: F83)